Larry Stephen McCall (born September 8, 1952) is a former Major League Baseball pitcher, who played with the New York Yankees (–) and the Texas Rangers during his career. He bats left-handed and throws right-handed.

Playing career
McCall was signed by the Baltimore Orioles on February 27, 1971, as an amateur free agent. On September 16, 1974, he was purchased by the California Angels, but was returned to the Orioles by the Angels on October 25 of the year. On April 10, 1976, he was released by the Orioles, and on the same day, signed with the New York Yankees as a free agent.

McCall made his Major League debut on September 10, 1977 with the Yankees against the Toronto Blue Jays at Yankee Stadium, with 20,296 people attending the game. McCall was called to replace Stan Thomas, and pitched the top of the seventh inning; the Yankees lost the game to the Blue Jays 19–4. On November 10, 1978, McCall was traded by the New York Yankees with Mike Heath, Sparky Lyle, Dave Rajsich, Domingo Ramos, and cash to the Texas Rangers for Dave Righetti, Juan Beníquez, Mike Griffin, Paul Mirabella, and minor leaguer Greg Jemison. He played his final Major League game on September 27, 1979. On January 4, 1980, McCall was traded by the Rangers with Mike Bucci (minors) and Gary Gray to the Cleveland Indians for David Clyde and Jim Norris.

Coaching career
McCall served as the pitching coach with the Bluefield Orioles in 1990. He later coached the Class-A Kane County Cougars for two seasons. He was with the Frederick Keys for the 1993 season and spent three seasons there before going to the High Desert Mavericks in 1996. McCall was the pitching coach for the Double-A Bowie Baysox in 1997, and that off-season he went to Australia to serve as the pitching coach for the Perth Heat. After spending the four years with the Rochester Red Wings, he served as the pitching coach for the Gulf Coast League Orioles in 2002, and for the Delmarva Shorebirds in 2003.

In 2005, McCall was named the winner of the Cal Ripken Sr. Player Development Award. McCall was the bullpen coach for Baltimore during the second half of the 2006 season. His 21 years as a coach in the organization came to an end on September 24, 2010 when the Orioles declined to retain him.

References

External links

Larry McCall at CNN.com
Larry McCall at Baseball-Almanac.com
Larry McCall at Sportspool.com

1952 births
Living people
Major League Baseball pitchers
New York Yankees players
Syracuse Chiefs players
Texas Rangers players
Baseball players from North Carolina
Major League Baseball bullpen coaches
Baltimore Orioles coaches
Bluefield Orioles players
Lodi Orions players
Rochester Red Wings players
Asheville Orioles players
West Haven Yankees players
Tacoma Yankees players
Tucson Toros players
Tacoma Tigers players
Knoxville Blue Jays players
Minor league baseball coaches
Sportspeople from Asheville, North Carolina